Pushkarikha is a rural locality (a village) in Mardengskoye Rural Settlement, Velikoustyugsky District, Vologda Oblast, Russia. The population was 25 as of 2002.

Geography 
Pushkarikha is located 11 km northwest of Veliky Ustyug (the district's administrative centre) by road. Yeskino is the nearest rural locality.

References 

Rural localities in Velikoustyugsky District